This is a list of episodes from the eleventh and final season of Happy Days.

Main cast
 Henry Winkler as Arthur "Fonzie" Fonzarelli
 Marion Ross as Marion Cunningham
 Scott Baio as Chachi Arcola
 Erin Moran as Joanie Cunningham
 Anson Williams as Warren "Potsie" Weber
 Ted McGinley as Roger Phillips 
 Tom Bosley as Howard Cunningham

Guest stars
 Ron Howard as Richie Cunningham
 Don Most as Ralph Malph
 Lynda Goodfriend as Lori Beth Cunningham
 Al Molinaro as Al Delvecchio
 Ellen Travolta as Louisa Delvecchio
 Cathy Silvers as Jenny Piccolo
 Pat Morita as Arnold
Harris Kal as Bobby
Kevin Sullivan as Tommy
Steven Baio as Joey

Broadcast history
The season aired Tuesdays at 8:30-9:00 pm (EST) and Thursdays at 8:00-8:30 pm (EST).

Episodes

Consisted of 22 episodes airing on ABC.
Beginning with this season, "Happy Days" was rerecorded in a more modern style. It featured Bobby Arvon on lead vocals, along with several backup vocalists. To accompany this version, new opening and closing credits were filmed, and the flashing Happy Days logo was redesigned, to make it more sitcom friendly.
Scott Baio and Erin Moran returned to the show in this season.

References

Happy Days 11
1983 American television seasons
1984 American television seasons